John McLaren may refer to:

John McLaren (baseball) (born 1951), American baseball manager
John McLaren (cricketer) (1886–1921), Australian cricketer
John McLaren (horticulturist) (1846–1943), built Golden Gate Park
John McLaren (public servant) (1871–1958), Australian public servant 
John McLaren, Lord McLaren (1831–1910), Scottish Liberal MP and judge
John Inglis McLaren (1865–1948), Canadian politician
John Francis McLaren (1919–1953), Welsh barrister and RAF officer
John F. McLaren (1855–1888), Chancellor of the University of Pittsburgh
John P. McLaren, U.S. Army general